Claudio Brook (born Claude Sydney Brook Marnat, 28 August 1927 – 18 October 1995) was a Mexican actor.

Life
Born in Mexico City, Brook had a prolific career, making around 100 film and television appearances in his 38 years as an actor. He won two Ariel Awards.

He died from stomach cancer in 1995.

For his work in motion pictures, Brook was inducted into the Paseo de las Luminarias.

Filmography

1927 births
1995 deaths
Male actors from Mexico City
Ariel Award winners
Best Actor Ariel Award winners
Mexican people of English descent
Mexican people of Basque descent
Mexican people of French descent
Deaths from stomach cancer
Mexican male film actors
Mexican male stage actors
Mexican male telenovela actors
20th-century Mexican male actors